ʿĀmir ibn ʿAbd Allāh ibn al-Jarrāḥ (583–639 CE), better known as Abū ʿUbayda was a Muslim commander and one of the Companions of the Islamic prophet Muhammad. He is mostly known for being one of the ten to whom Paradise was promised. He remained commander of a large section of the Rashidun Army during the time of the Rashid Caliph Umar and was on the list of Umar's appointed successors to the Rashidun Caliphate but died (of plague in 639) before Umar did.

Ancestry and early life
Abu Ubayda belonged to the al-Harith ibn Fihr clan, also called the Balharith, of the Quraysh tribe. The clan was settled in the lower quarter of Mecca, a town in the Hejaz (western Arabia) and home of the Quraysh. During the pre-Islamic period (pre-620s), the Balharith were allied to the Banu Abd Manaf (the ancestral clan of the Islamic prophet Muhammad) in the Mutayyabun faction, against the other Qurayshite clans headed by the Banu Abd al-Dar. Abu Ubayda's father Abd Allah was among the chiefs of the Quraysh in the Fijar War against the Hawazin nomads in the late 6th century. His mother was also a Qurayshite.

Abu Ubayda was born around 583 CE. Before embracing Islam, he was considered to be one of the nobles of the Quraysh and had a reputation among his tribesmen for modesty and bravery.

Companion of Muhammad
By 611, Muhammad was preaching the oneness of God to the people of Mecca. He began by inviting his closest companions and relatives in private to the way of Islam. He embraced Islam a day after Abu Bakr in the year 611 at the age of 28.

Abu Ubayda lived through the harsh experience that the Muslims went through in Mecca from beginning to end. With other early Muslims, he endured the insults and oppressions of the Quraysh.

In 623 CE, when Muhammad migrated from Mecca to Medina, Abu Ubayda also migrated. When Muhammad arrived in Medina, he paired off each immigrant (Muhajir) with one of the residents of Medina (Ansari), joining Muhammad ibn Maslamah with Abu Ubayda making them brothers in faith.

Military career under Muhammad
In the year 624, Abu Ubayda participated in the first major battle between the Muslims and the Quraysh of Mecca, at the Battle of Badr. In this battle, he fought his own father Abdullah ibn al-Jarrah, who was fighting alongside the army of Quraysh. Abu Ubayda then later on attacked him and killed him.

In the year 625, he participated in the Battle of Uhud. In the second phase of the battle, when Khalid ibn al-Walid's cavalry attacked the Muslims from the rear, changing an Islamic victory into defeat, the bulk of the Muslim soldiers were routed from the battlefield, and few remained steadfast. Abu Ubayda was one of them and he guarded Muhammad from the attacks of the Qurayshi soldiers. On that day, Abu Ubayda lost two of his front teeth while trying to extract two links of Muhammad's armour that had penetrated into his cheeks.

Later in the year 627 he took part in the Battle of the Trench and also in the Invasion of Banu Qurayza. He was also made commander of a small expedition that set out to attack and destroy the tribes of Tha'libah and Anmar, who were plundering nearby villages.

In the year 628 he participated in Treaty of Hudaybiyyah and was made one of the witnesses over the pact. Later in the same year, he was a part of the Muslim campaign to Khaybar.

In the year 630, when the Muslim army conquered Mecca, Abu Ubayda was commanding one of the four divisions that entered the city from four different routes. Later that year, he participated in the Battle of Hunayn and the Siege of Ta'if. He was also part of the Tabuk campaign under the command of Muhammad himself. On their return from the Battle of Tabuk, a Christian delegation from Najran arrived in Medina and showed interest in Islam and asked Muhammad to send them a person to guide them in the matters of religion and in other tribal affairs according to Islamic laws, Abu Ubayda was appointed by Muhammad to go with them. He was also sent as the tax collector to Bahrain by Muhammad. He was present in Mecca when Muhammad died in 632.

In the year 629 Muhammad sent 'Amr ibn al-'As to Daat al-Salaasil from where he called for reinforcements, this was known as the Expedition of Abu Ubayda ibn al-Jarrah. Muhammad sent Abu Ubayda in command of an army that included Abu Bakr and Umar. They attacked and defeated the enemy. Later in the same year, another expedition was sent under his command to locate the routes of Qurayshi caravans.

Role in the succession of Abu Bakr
Muhammad died in 632 and the Muslims were in disagreement over who would succeed him as leader of their nascent community. On the same day of the Islamic prophet's death, the Ansar convened, in what became known as the Saqifah, and chose one of their own as caliph. Their principal aim was to prevent a Meccan, especially the new converts among the Qurayshite aristocracy, from gaining power over them. Opinion among the Muhajirun were split, with one side favoring a person closer to Muhammad in kinship, namely Ali, who they held was favored by Muhammad to succeed him. The other faction of the Muhajirun mostly backed Abu Bakr due to his seniority, closeness to Muhammad, and the increasingly important role he was attaining in the prophet's last years. The bulk of the Qurayshite new converts, with the prominent exception of Abu Sufyan, backed Abu Bakr.

The Islamic tradition generally portrays Abu Bakr, Umar and Abu Ubayda as operating in concert and decisively intervening against the Ansar at Saqifah. After a debate, the triumvirate obtained the allegiance of the Ansarites to Abu Bakr despite their reservations. There are indications, according to the modern historian Elias Shoufani, that Umar initially favored Abu Ubayda as caliph, but that he lacked sufficient support against Abu Bakr, who he consequently supported against other potential candidates. A report in the history of al-Baladhuri holds that after Muhammad died, Umar told Abu Ubayda "Stretch your hand and let us give you the bay'ah [oath of allegiance], for you are the custodian (Amīn) of this ummah (the Muslim community), as the prophet called you". Abu Ubayda is then said to have declined in favor of Abu Bakr. Another report in the history of al-Tabari holds that Abu Bakr offered at Saqifah the caliphate to Umar or Abu Ubayda, but both insisted on Abu Bakr's succession.

Commander in Syria

Deployment and appointment to supreme command
As the Ridda wars came to an end, Abu Bakr dispatched three or four armies at the same or different intervals toward Byzantine Syria to conquer that region. Though there are several versions in the early Islamic tradition, including in the works of Ibn Hubaysh al-Asadi, al-Mas'udi (d. 956), al-Azdi (d. 944), as well as the 10th-century-compiled Kitab al-Aghani, that place Abu Ubayda as one of these commanders, modern research, including by historians H. A. R. Gibb, C. H. Becker, Philip K. Hitti, Andreas Stratos, D. R. Hill and Khalil Athamina date his dispatch to after Abu Bakr's death. In the comprehensive 9th-century history of the early Muslim conquests by al-Baladhuri, the latter states "there is no truth" to the claim Abu Ubayda was sent by Abu Bakr; rather, the caliph "intended to send Abu ʿUbayda at the head of one of the armies, but the latter asked the caliph to relieve him of this mission". Athamina assesses that "certain allusions" in the Islamic sources offer context to the notion that Abu Ubayda, despite his participation in several expeditions under Muhammad and his high-standing among the Muslims, did not have the desire nor the necessary military experience and merit to accept the post Abu Bakr offered him.

Modern research indicates that Abu Ubayda was dispatched to the Syrian front by Abu Bakr's successor, Umar, and early Muslim authors al-Baladhuri, al-Fasawi (d. 890) and Ibn Asakir (d. 1175) mention it was in the capacity of commander of an army of reinforcements. His arrival most likely dated to around 636, shortly after the first Muslim capture of Damascus in late 635 or during the preparation for the subsequent Battle of the Yarmuk. At the time, supreme command of the Muslim armies in Syria was held by Khalid ibn al-Walid. Umar may have sent Abu Ubayda to assume the supreme command. Several accounts in the Islamic tradition claim Abu Ubayda concealed the caliph's order from the rest of the army to avoid potentially insulting Khalid or provoking a mutiny while the Muslims were on the cusp of a major confrontation with the Byzantines. Athamina dismisses the reliability of these claims, considering them militarily illogical and meant to dramatize the change in command and emphasize Abu Ubayda's "moral superiority and unselfishness". Instead, Athamina maintains Abu Ubayda's appointment to the supreme command was made by Umar, who had kept in constant contact with Abu Ubayda through letters and emissaries, after the decisive Muslim victory at the Yarmuk.

Abu Ubayda may have been chosen to lead at that time, when the Byzantine defense of Syria had taken an enormous blow, as the circumstances called for an able administrator to take the helm from a military commander like Khalid. The Islamic tradition provides a host of moral and personal reasons why Khalid was demoted in favor of Abu Ubayda, but most modern historians view these as either partially valid or literary innovations. Athamina holds Abu Ubayda was likely installed because Khalid and his large force of tribesmen from Arabia and Iraq, along with their families, presented a threat to the old-established, formerly Byzantine-allied, and militarily experienced Arab tribes of Syria, whose defection was considered vital by Umar to form a network of defense against the Byzantines. This motivated him to demote Khalid and disband his army, the remnants of which were transferred to the Sasanian front in Iraq.

Ajnadayn and Damascus
All the divisions of the Muslim army, about 32,000 in number, joined Khalid at Ajnadayn on 24 July 634. Under the command of Khalid ibn al-Walid the Muslims defeated the Byzantine army there on 30 July 634 at the Battle of Ajnadayn. After one week, Abu Ubayda, along with Khalid, moved towards Damascus. On their way to Damascus, they defeated another Byzantine army at the Battle of Yakusa in mid-August 634. Caloiis and Azrail, the governor of Damascus, led another army to stop Khalid's corps but they were also defeated in the battle of Maraj-al-Safar on 19 August 634.

The next day the Muslims reached Damascus and besieged the city, which continued for 30 days. After defeating the Byzantine reinforcements sent by Emperor Heraclius at the Battle of Sanita-al-Uqab,  from Damascus, Khalid's forces attacked and entered the city. With Khalid's divisions investing the city from the northeast, Thomas, the purported son-in-law of the Emperor Heraclius, surrendered the city to Ubayda, who was besieging the Bab al-Jabiya (Jabiya Gate), on 19 September 634.

Abu Ubayda was appointed by Khalid ibn al-Walid to siege the Jabiya Gate of Damascus. It was Abu Ubayda who gave peace to Damascus after Khalid ibn al-Walid attacked the city and conquered it by force. Abu Ubayda, Sharjeel ibn Hassana and 'Amr ibn al-'As, unaware of Khalid's attack from the Eastern Gate, gave peace to them, which was reluctantly endorsed by Khalid. The Byzantine army was given a cease fire of three days and allowed to go as far as they could with their families and treasure. Others simply agreed to stay at Damascus and pay tribute. The Muslims controlled the road to Emessa, so the Byzantines went west and then north up the Beqaa Valley. After the three-day truce was over, the Muslim cavalry, under Khalid's command, pursued the Byzantine column via the shorter Emessa road and caught them in the northwest Beqaa Valley, just before they entered the mountains en route to Antioch at the Battle of Maraj-al-Debaj.

Conquest of central Syria

Soon after the appointment of Abu-Ubayda as commander in chief, he sent a small detachment to the annual fair held at Abu-al-Quds, modern day Abla, near Zahlé; east of Beirut. There was a Byzantine and Christian Arab garrison guarding that fair, the size of the garrison was miscalculated by the Muslim informants and it quickly encircled the small Muslim detachment. Before it would have been completely destroyed, Abu Ubayda, having received new intelligence, sent Khalid to rescue the Muslim army. Khalid reached there and defeated them in the Battle of Abu-al-Quds on 15 October 634 and returned with tons of looted booty from the fair and hundreds of Byzantine prisoners.

With central Syria captured, the Muslims has given a decisive blow to the Byzantines. The communication between northern Syria and Palestine was now cut off. The region was crucial because from here the Byzantine army could strike eastwards and cut the communications line with Arabia. Moreover, with this large garrison at the rear, Palestine could not be invaded.

Thus the Muslim army moved to Fahl. The Byzantine army was eventually defeated at the Battle of Fahl on 23 January 635 A.D.

Battles for Emesa and the second battle of Damascus
After the battle, which would prove to be a key to Palestine and Jordan, the Muslim armies split up. Sharjeel and Amr's corps moved south to capture Palestine. Meanwhile, Abu Ubayda and Khalid with a relatively larger corps moved north through Lebanon to conquer Lebanon and northern Syria.

While the Muslims were occupied at Fahl, Heraclius, sensing the opportunity, quickly sent an army under General Theodore Trithyrius to recapture Damascus, where a small Muslim garrison had been left. Shortly after Heraclius dispatched this new army, the Muslims having finished the business at Fahl, were on their way to Emesa. The Byzantine army met the Muslims half way to Emesa, at Maraj-al-Rome. During the night Theodras sent half of his army towards Damascus to launch a surprise attack on the Muslim garrison

Khalid's spy informed him about the move, Khalid having received permission from Abu Ubayda, galloped towards Damascus with his mobile guard. While Abu Ubayda fought and defeated the Byzantine army in the Battle of Marj ar-Rum, Khalid moved to Damascus with his cavalry and attacked and defeated Theodras in the second battle of Damascus.

A week later, Abu Ubayda himself moved towards Baalbek (Heliopolis), where the great Temple of Jupiter stood. Baalbek surrendered to Muslim rule after little resistance and agreed to pay tribute. Abu Ubayda sent Khalid straight towards Emesa.

Emesa and Chalcis sued for peace for a year. Abu Ubayda, accepted the offer and rather than invading the districts of Emesa and Chalcis, he consolidated his rule in conquered land and captured Hama, Maarrat al-Nu'man. The peace treaties were, however, on Heraclius's instructions, to lure the Muslims and to secure time for preparation of defenses of northern Syria (present day Lebanon, Syria and southern Turkey). Having mustered sizeable armies at Antioch, Heraclius sent them to reinforce strategically important areas of northern Syria, like Emesa and Chalcis. With the arrival of Byzantine army in the city, the peace treaty was violated, Abu Ubadiah and Khalid thus marched to Emesa, and a Byzantine army that halted Khalid's advance guard was defeated. The Muslims besieged Emesa which was finally conquered in March 636 after six months of siege.

Battle of Yarmouk

After capturing Emesa, the Muslims moved north to capture whole of the northern Syria. Khalid, acting as an advance guard took his mobile guard to raid northern Syria. At Shaizer, Khalid intercepted a convoy taking provisions for Chalcis. The prisoners were interrogated and informed him about Emperor Heraclius' ambitious plan to take back Syria. They told him that an army, possibly 200,000 strong, would soon emerge to recapture their territory. Khalid stopped there. After his past experiences, Heraclius, now had been avoiding pitch battles with the Muslims. He planned to send massive reinforcements to all the major cities and isolate the Muslim corps from each other, and thus separately encircle and destroy the Muslim armies. Five massive armies were launched in June 636 to roll back Syria.

Khalid, sensing Heraclius's plan, feared that the Muslim armies would be isolated and destroyed. In a council of war he suggested that Abu Ubayda draw all the Muslim armies to one place so as to fight a decisive battle with the Byzantines. As per Khalid's suggestion, Abu Ubayda ordered all the Muslim armies in Syria to evacuate the conquered land and concentrate at Jabiya. This maneuver gave a decisive blow to the Heraclius's plan, as he did not wish engage his troops in an open battle with the Muslims, where the light cavalry could be effectively used. From Jabiya, on Khalid's suggestion, Abu Ubayda ordered the Muslim army to withdraw on the plain of the Yarmouk River, where cavalry could be used. While the Muslim armies were gathering at Yarmouk, Khalid intercepted and routed the Byzantine advance guard. This was to ensure the safe retreat of the Muslims from conquered land.

The Muslim armies reached there in July 636. A week or two later, around mid July, the Byzantine army arrived. The Byzantine commander in chief, Vahan, sent Christian Arab troops of the Ghassanid king, Jabalah ibn al-Aiham, to check the strength of the Muslims. Khalid's mobile guard defeated and routed the Christian Arabs; this was the last action before the battle started. For the next month negotiations continued between the two armies, and Khalid went to meet Vahan in person at Byzantine camp. Meanwhile, the Muslims received reinforcements sent by Caliph Umar.

Finally on 15 August, the Battle of Yarmouk was fought, it lasted for 6 days and ended in a devastating defeat for the Byzantines. The Battle of Yarmouk is considered to be one of the most decisive battles of history. It was the historic defeat that sealed the fate of Byzantines, the magnitude of defeat was so intense that Byzantine could never recover from it. It left whole of the Byzantine Empire vulnerable to the Muslims. The battle was the greatest battle ever fought on Syrian soil till then and was a tactical marvel of Abu Ubayda.

Siege of Jerusalem
With the Byzantine army shattered and routed, the Muslims quickly recaptured the territory that they conquered prior to Yarmouk. Abu Ubayda held a meeting with his high command, including Khalid, to decide on future conquests. They decided to conquer Jerusalem. The Siege of Jerusalem lasted four months after which the city agreed to surrender, but only to caliph Umar in person. 'Amr ibn al-'As suggested that Khalid should be sent as caliph, because of his very strong resemblance to Umar. Khalid was recognized and eventually, Umar came and the Jerusalem surrendered on April 637. After Jerusalem, the Muslim armies broke up once again. Yazid's corps went to Damascus and captured Beirut. Amr and Shurahbil's corps went on to conquer the rest of Palestine, while Abu Ubayda and Khalid, at the head of a 17,000 strong army moved north to conquer whole of the northern Syria.

Abu Ubayda sent the commanders 'Amr ibn al-'As, Yazid ibn Abi Sufyan, and Shurahbil ibn Hassana back to their areas to reconquer them. Most of the areas submitted without a fight. Abu Ubayda himself, along with Khalid, moved to northern Syria once again to conquer them with a 17,000 strong army. Khalid along with his cavalry was sent to Hazir and Abu Ubayda moved to Chalcis.

Conquest of northern Syria

With Emesa already in hand, Abu Ubayda and Khalid moved towards Chalcis, which was strategically the most significant Byzantine fort.

Defense of Emesa
After the devastating defeat in the Battle of Yarmouk, the remainder of the Byzantine empire was left vulnerable. With few military resources left, it was no longer in a position to attempt a military comeback in Syria. To gain time to prepare a defense of the rest of his empire, Heraclius needed the Muslims occupied in Syria Heraclius thus sought help from the Christian Arab tribes which came of Jazirah that mainly from Circesium and Hīt and the tribes mustered a large army and marched to besiege Emesa. Abu Ubayda withdrew all his forces from northern Syria to Emesa as a part of complex strategy which he devised to repel the massive invasion of the Christian Arabs against Emesa, while Caliph Umar instructed Abu Ubaydah to send his field commanders outside of Emesa with sufficient splinter forces to lay counter siege to cities in Jazira, homeland of enemy Arab christian tribes, in order to divert the focus of enemy concentration in Emesa. So the splinter forces under Iyadh ibn Ghanm In 638 the Muslims attacked Hīt, which they found to be well fortified; thus, they left a fraction of the army to impose a siege on the city, while the rest went after Circesium.

After Emesa
Later on, In Chalcis, the Byzantines would guard Anatolia, Heraclius's homeland Armenia and there the Asian zone's capital Antioch. Abu Ubayda sent Khalid, with his elite cavalry, the mobile guard, towards Chalcis. The fort was guarded by the Greek troops under their commander, Menas, who was reported to be of high prestige, second only to the emperor himself. This is known as the Battle of Hazir, which even forced Umar to praise Khalid's military genius. Umar is reported to have said:

Abu Ubayda soon joined Khalid at the virtually impregnable fort of Chalcis, which surrendered in June 637. With this strategic victory, the territory north of Chalcis lay open to the Muslims. Khalid and Abu Ubayda continued their march northward and laid siege to Aleppo, which was captured after fierce resistance from desperate Byzantine troops in October 637. The next objective was the splendid city of Antioch, the capital of the Asian zone of the Byzantine Empire.

Before marching towards Antioch, Khalid and Abu Ubayda decided to isolate the city from Anatolia. Accordingly, they sent detachments north to eliminate all possible Byzantine forces and captured a garrison town, Azaz  from Aleppo; from there the Muslims attacked Antioch on the eastern side. In order to save the empire from annihilation, a desperate battle was fought between the Muslim army and that of the defenders of Antioch, popularly known as Battle of Iron Bridge. The Byzantine army was composed of the survivors of Yarmouk and other Syrian campaigns. After being defeated, the Byzantines retreated to Antioch and the Muslims besieged the city. Having little hope of help from Emperor Herakleios, Antioch surrendered on 30 October 637, with the terms that all Byzantine troops would be given safe passage to Constantinople.

Abu Ubayda sent Khalid northwards, while he marched south and captured Lazkia, Jabla, Tartus and the coastal areas west of Anti-Lebanon Mountains. Khalid moved north and raided territory up to the Kızıl River (Kızılırmak) in Anatolia. Emperor Heraclius had already left Antioch for Edessa before the arrival of the Muslims. He arranged for the necessary defenses in Al-Jazira and Armenia and left for his capital Constantinople. On his way to Constantinople he had a narrow escape when Khalid, after the capturing Marash, was heading south towards Munbij. Heraclius hastily took the mountainous path and, passing through the Cilician Gates, is reported to have said:

With the devastating defeat at Yarmouk his empire was extremely vulnerable to Muslim invasion. With few military resources left he was no longer in a position to attempt a military come back in Syria. To gain time for the preparations of the defense of the rest of his empire, Heraclius needed the Muslims occupied in Syria. He sought help of the Christian Arabs of Al-Jazira who mustered up a large army and marched against Emesa, Abu Ubayda's headquarters. Abu Ubayda withdrew all his forces from northern Syria to Emesa, and the Christian Arabs laid siege to the city. Khalid was in favour of an open battle outside the fort, but Abu Ubayda rather sent the matter to Umar, who handled it brilliantly. Umar sent detachments of the Muslim army from Iraq to invade Al-Jazira, homeland of the invading Christian Arabs, from three different routes. Moreover, another detachment was sent to Emesa from Iraq under Qa'qa ibn Amr, a veteran of Yarmouk who was sent to Iraq for the Battle of al-Qādisiyyah. Umar himself marched from Medina at the head of 1,000 men. The Christian Arabs, when they received the news of the Muslim invasion of their homeland, abandoned the siege and hastily withdrew to Al-Jazira. At this point Khalid and his mobile guard came out of the fort and devastated the army, attacking them from the rear.

Campaigns in Armenia and Anatolia

After the battle Umar ordered the conquest of Al-Jazira, which was completed by late summer 638 A.D. Following the victory, Abu Ubayda sent Khalid and Iyad ibn Ghanm (conqueror of Al-Jazira) to invade the Byzantine territory north of Al-Jazira. They marched independently and captured Edessa, Amida (Diyarbakır), Malatya and whole of Armenia up to Ararat and raided northern and central Anatolia. Heraclius has already abandoned all the forts between Antioch and Tartus to create a buffer zone or no man's land between Muslim controlled areas and mainland Anatolia.

Umar for the time being stopped his armies from further invasion deeper into Anatolia but rather ordered Abu Ubayda, now the governor of Syria, to consolidate his rule in Syria. At this point, Umar is reported to have said:

Due to the dismissal of Khalid from the army and a famine and plague the next year, the Muslim armies were kept from invading Anatolia. The expedition to Anatolia and Armenia marked the end of the military career of Khalid.

Relief efforts during the 638 famine
Later that year Arabia fell into a severe drought, and large sums of people began to perish from hunger and epidemic diseases alike, both resulting from the drought and its complications. Therefore, countless numbers of people (in the hundreds of thousands), from throughout Arabia, gathered at Medina as food was being rationed. Soon, Medina's food reserves declined to alarming levels; by this time, Caliph Umar had already written to the governors of his provinces requesting any relevant aid they might assist with. One such letter was rushed to Abu Ubayda, who responded promptly:

True to his assurance, Abu Ubayda's caravans of food supplies were the first to reach Medina, with 4,000 camels arriving full of food. To handle the overwhelming amount, Umar appointed Abu Ubayda to distribute this among the thousands of people living in the outskirts of Medina. Following Abu Ubayda's generous aid and efforts, Umar provided 4,000 dinars as a modest stipend or token of appreciation which, he refused on the grounds that the deed was done for the sake of God.

Plague of Amwas

Nine months had passed since the drought and a new problem had started brewing. The plague epidemic broke in Syria and western Iraq; it was most severe in Syria. When the news of plague broke Umar had been on his way for a tour of Syria but, he returned from the Syrian border as advised by his companions. Abu Ubayda met him there and said:

Umar was shocked by this and said in sorrow: if only someone else would have said this other than you Abu Ubayda and then said:

Umar returned from Syria because Muhammad once instructed that one should not enter the place where an epidemic is unless it is absolutely safe. So Abu Ubayda returned to his army at Emesa. It was then that a plague hit the land of Syria, the like of which people had never experienced before. It devastated the population. As Caliph Umar wanted to make Abu Ubayda his successor he didn't want him to remain there in the epidemic region. Umar dispatched a messenger to Abu Ubayda with a letter saying:

When Abu Ubaydah received Umar's letter, he said, '"I know why Umar needs me. He wants to secure the survival of someone who, however, is not eternal." So he wrote to Umar:

When Caliph Umar read this letter tears filled his eyes and those who were with him asked, "Has Abu Ubayda died?" he replied "No, but death is near to him." Caliph Umar sent another messenger to him saying that if you are not coming back at least move to any highland with a less humid environment and Abu Ubayda moved to Jabiya.

Another reason why Abu Ubaydah did not leave Syria is because Muhammad once ordered that if a state is being hit by a plague, none from the state should escape and none from outside the state shall enter it (quarantine).

Death
As soon as Abu Ubayda moved to Jabiya he became afflicted with the plague. As death hung over him, he spoke to his army:

He then appointed Muadh ibn Jabal as his successor and ordered him to lead people in prayers; after the prayers Muadh went to him and, at that moment, Abu Ubayda died.

Muadh got up and said to the people:

Abu Ubayda left no descendants.

Character
His appearance was striking, slim and tall and his face was bright and he had a sparse beard. It was pleasing to look at him and refreshing to meet him. He was extremely courteous and humble and quite shy. Yet in a tough situation he would become strikingly serious and alert.

Several early Islamic sources and the hadith compilations of Sahih Bukhari and Sahih Muslim all note that Abu Ubayda was held by Muhammad to have been the umma's (Muslim community's) "man of trust". According to Gibb, Abu Ubayda "was clearly a man whose personality impressed his contemporaries, but he is presented by later tradition in a rather colourless fashion".

Abdullah ibn Umar once said about him:

He chose to live a simple way of life, opting for the most modest of garments when compared to some of the other sahaba (companions of Muhammad). When, during the conquest of Jerusalem, Caliph Umar had come to Syria, he was met by Khalid ibn al-Walid and Yazid bin abu Sufyan; Caliph Umar dismounted from his camel and threw sand at them while admonishing them that "it has not been even a year since you have come out of the hunger and hard life of Arabia and you have forgotten all the simplicity when you saw the glamour of Syria's Emperors?" Both men were incidentally wearing better garments then they were previously accustomed; Khalid ibn al-Walid noted that beneath their clothes they were still sufficiently armed, indicating they were still accustomed to the practical ways of hard desert life, bringing some relief to the Caliph. Comparatively, Abu Ubayda was also present, but had always maintained his humble dressing and way of life; Umar was pleased to see him, and that very evening, when Umar arrived at his home, he saw that Abu Ubayda, a man made successful in the art of battle (earning him rights to much booty), had no possessions at home except one bed, a sword and a shield. Umar said to him:

He is regarded by Muslims to be one of the ten to whom Paradise was promised during their lifetime.

The Ubaydah Bin Al Jarrah Air Base near Kut, Iraq is named after him.

Tomb

Beginning in the 13th century, Abu Ubayda's tomb was held to be in the village of Ammata in the Jordan Valley area of Transjordan. That part of the valley became known 'Ghawr Abi Ubayda'. Earlier places where Abu Ubayda and his wife were said to have been buried were Tiberias and Beisan in the Jordan district (corresponding to the Galilee and its environs). The traveler al-Harawi, who visited the tomb in Ammata at the beginning of the 13th century, mentions that his tomb was shown in all three places.

The Jarrahs, the family that traditionally maintained the tomb, claimed descent from Abu Ubayda, and were exempt by the Ottoman authorities from paying taxes. They had a waqf on the property and collected donations to Abu Ubayda's memory from farmers and traders at the market nearest the tomb.

See also
 
List of Sahabah
The ten to whom Paradise was promised
Sunni view of the Sahaba
List of expeditions of Muhammad

Notes

References

Bibliography

External links 
 The Battle of Ajnadein
 Ameen ul Ummah Hazrat Abu Ubaidah Bin Jarrah
 Abu Ubaydah ibn Al-Jarrah
 Abu Ubaidah

583 births
639 deaths
7th-century deaths from plague (disease)
Arab people of the Arab–Byzantine wars
Generals of the Rashidun Caliphate
People of the Muslim conquest of the Levant
Quraysh
Rashidun governors of Syria
Sahabah hadith narrators